Jocelyn Rae and Anna Smith were the defending champions, having won the previous edition in 2014, however Rae had since retired from professional tennis, whilst Smith chose not to participate.

Monica Niculescu and Elena-Gabriela Ruse won the title, defeating Priscilla Hon and Storm Sanders in the final, 7–5, 7–5.

Seeds

Draw

Draw

References

External Links
Main Draw

Nottingham Trophy - Doubles